General Chalermchai Sitthisart PC is a retired Thai military officer and general within the Royal Thai Army. In September 2016, he was chosen to serve as the Commander in Chief of the Royal Thai Army, and was endorsed by then-King Bhumibol Adulyadej. Sitthisart was appointed to replace the retiring Teerachai Nakwanich, with his appointment taking effect on October 1. Chalermchai start working after graduated from the military school at Royal Thai Army Special Warfare Command as a  special operations force officer so that Chalermchai's appointment marked a departure from the Burapha Payak royalist military faction - known as the "Eastern Tigers", as he is considered to not have ties with the dominant faction. Almost immediately following his retirement, he was appointed to the Privy Council.

Education and careers 
Chalermchai study in primary and secondary at Benjamaratrangsarit school at Chachoengsao Province and then attending the Armed Forces Academies Preparatory School as a pre-cadet as a prerequisite for attending Chulachomklao Royal Military Academy (CRMA), Class 16. After graduated in Military school, he studies at Command and General Staff College and National Defence College.

Chalermchai previously held a position of Chief of Staff of the Special Warfare Command and then become Commander of the 1st Special Forces Division, Commander of the Special Warfare Command, Assistant Commander-in-Chief and finally serve at the position of Commander-in-Chief.

References

Chalermchai Sitthisart
Chalermchai Sitthisart
Living people
1957 births
Chalermchai Sitthisart
Chalermchai Sitthisart
Chalermchai Sitthisart
Chalermchai Sitthisart